"By My Side" is the first single from rapper Jadakiss's third studio album, The Last Kiss. The song was produced by Eric Hudson and  features R&B singer Ne-Yo. It samples Teena Marie's "I Need Your Lovin'".

Music video
A music video was released on November 13, 2008. It was directed by Ray Kay.

Charts

References

2008 songs
2009 singles
Jadakiss songs
Ne-Yo songs
Songs written by Eric Hudson
Songs written by Jadakiss
Songs written by Ne-Yo
Song recordings produced by Eric Hudson
Music videos directed by Ray Kay
Roc-A-Fella Records singles
Ruff Ryders Entertainment singles
Def Jam Recordings singles